The Fucking Cunts Treat Us Like Pricks is an album by English anarcho-punk band Flux of Pink Indians. It was released as a double album on the band's own Spiderleg Records in 1984 as the follow-up to their debut, Strive to Survive Causing Least Suffering Possible.

The album was banned by several major retailers including HMV due to its sexually explicit title and cover art. Under the direction of James Anderton copies were seized, along with other records by Crass and Dead Kennedys, by Greater Manchester Police from Eastern Bloc record shop, who were charged with displaying "Obscene Articles For Publication For Gain". The album's lyrical content concerned violence between men and women, based on the experiences of a band member who had been sexually assaulted. The title was a Dada-style ploy to get attention for this social message. The band, its two record labels and its publishing company were also charged under the Obscene Publications Act, but all charges were dropped.

The album also featured artwork by Crass guitarist Andy Palmer.

The Fucking Cunts... reached number two on the UK Indie Chart, spending fifteen weeks on the chart in total. It was reissued in 1986 on band member Derek Birkett's own One Little Indian label.

Track listing

Side one
"Punk"
"Mind Fuckers Fucking Minds"
"Hard Sell"
"Love Song"
"Mickey on Tuneoil"

Side two
"Desire"
"Blood Lust Rite"
"The Falklands War"

Side three
"Punk"
"Life We Make"
"Trouble at the Heart"
"The Sun (the Paper That Supports Our Boys and Rapes Our Girls)"
"Shadow of Abuse"
"Very Funny"

Side four
"Cure for the Coprolite"

References

1984 albums
Flux of Pink Indians albums